Donald C. Songer was a Major League Baseball pitcher. He played four seasons in the major leagues, from  until , for the Pittsburgh Pirates and New York Giants.

Sources

Major League Baseball pitchers
Pittsburgh Pirates players
New York Giants (NL) players
Kansas City Blues (baseball) players
Augusta Georgians players
Enid Harvesters players
Oklahoma City Indians players
Toronto Maple Leafs (International League) players
Tulsa Oilers (baseball) players
Baseball players from Kansas
People from Crawford County, Kansas
1899 births
1962 deaths